The 2000 Formula Renault UK season was the 12th British Formula Renault Championship. The season ended, after twelve rounds held in the United Kingdom. 32 driver competed in this series with only 10 scoring points. All driver used the Tatuus FR2000 (Renault) car.

Series rookie Kimi Räikkönen dominated the season taking 7 wins and 10 podiums out of 10 races he competed in, the following year he made a successful move to Formula One with Sauber.

Calendar

Drivers' Championship

 Points were awarded on a 32-28-25-22-20-18-16-14-12-11-10-9-8-7-6-5-4-3-2-1 basis, with 2 points for fastest lap.

References

UK
2000 in British motorsport